The year 2018 was the 237th year of the Rattanakosin Kingdom of Thailand. It was the 3rd year in the reign of King Vajiralongkorn (Rama X), and was the year 2561 in the Buddhist Era.

Incumbents
 King: Vajiralongkorn 
 Prime Minister: Prayut Chan-o-cha
 Supreme Patriarch: Ariyavongsagatanana VIII

Events
29 April – Protesters rally against a housing project for Ministry of Justice government officials in Chiang Mai, which was seen as encroaching on forest land.
22 May – Protests against the military rule mark the fourth anniversary of the 2014 Thai coup d'état.
18 June – Thailand executes its first execution in nine years and the man was the country's seventh person to be executed by means of lethal injection.
23 June onwards – Tham Luang cave rescue
5 July – 2018 Phuket boat capsizing
17 December – Miss Universe 2018

Deaths

21 January – Chartchai Chionoi, boxer, WBC world champion and WBA world champion in flyweight (b. 1942).
6 July – Saman Gunan, diver, participant in Tham Luang cave rescue.
6 August – Nat Indrapana, IOC Member in Thailand.
27 October – Vichai Srivaddhanaprabha, 60, duty-free retailer (King Power) and football club owner Leicester City), helicopter crash.

References

 
2010s in Thailand 
Years of the 21st century in Thailand 
Thailand 
Thailand